Tyne Tees may be known as:

ITV Tyne Tees, formerly Tyne Tees Television
Tyne Tees Tigers, Australian football club
Tyne–Tees derby, a football term
Tyne-Tees Regiment, formed in 1999
Tyne Tees Steam Shipping Company, opened in the 1900s
50th (Northumbrian) Infantry Division, also known as the Tyne-Tees division